China Youth University of Political Studies is a university in Beijing, established in 1985 by the Communist Youth League of China. Since then the university has been affiliated with the league, and the leader (First Secretary) of the league usually holds the presidency of the university. Hu Jintao, the General Secretary of the Chinese Communist Party and President of China, was once the president of this university. The university's  campus is located in Xisanhuan Bei Lu (West 3rd Ring Northern Road) in Beijing.

History
The university grew from the Central School of the Communist Youth League of China which was founded in 1948.

Colleges and majors
The university is a major law and politics institute in China doing research on Marxism, Public Administration, Youth Culture and Youth Development, Social Work, Criminal Law, and Journalism. The first youth work department in China was founded in this university in 1985. The university also has the first and largest social work department (now a social work college) in mainland China.

China Youth University of Political Studies focuses on undergraduate education. The university has undergraduate majors such as Economics, Law, Journalism and Mass Communication, Social Work, Sociology, Social Security, Youth Work, Public Administration, Chinese Language and Literature, and Foreign Languages and Literature.

The university also provides post-graduate education in such fields as Marxism, Sociology, Criminal Law, Economic Law, Journalism, and Economics.

Facilities
In 2013, the CYU library became a branch of the National Library of China.

List of presidents
The office of the President of the CYUPL is held by the First Secretary of the Communist Youth League. 
Hu Yaobang: 1957–78
Han Ying (Hán Yīng): 1978–82
Wang Zhaoguo: 1982–84
Hu Jintao : 1984–85
Song Defu: 1985–93
Li Keqiang: 1993–98
Zhou Qiang: 1998–2006
Hu Chunhua: 2006–08
Lu Hao: 2008–13
Qin Yizhi: 2013–

References

External links
Official website

Educational institutions established in 1948
1948 establishments in China
Communist Youth League of China
Universities and colleges in Haidian District